Anthony Cross may refer to:
 Anthony Cross (cricketer) (born 1945), English cricketer
 Anthony Cross (literary scholar) (born 1936), British historian of Russia

See also
Anthony Crosse, Irish hurler